Robert Frankel (born June 20, 1980) is an American boxer.

Professional career
Robert holds wins over veterans like Mike González, Michael Stewart, Ramón Montaño, Bobby Pacquiao, and Ricardo Dominguez.

On June 24, 2011, Frankel faced Mexican-American John Molina, Jr. in the main event on ESPN's Friday Night Fights.

References

External links

Boxers from New Mexico
Light-welterweight boxers
1980 births
Living people
American male boxers